Wallace Park is a city park in northwest Portland, Oregon, United States.

Description and history
The park was acquired in 1920, and is named after Hugh W. Wallace, the city councilman responsible for getting the property allocated as a city park. One art installation in the park is a 1980 sculpture by Manuel Izquierdo called Silver Dawn. Also located within the park and surrounding school yard exist eleven bronze objects, created by artist Bill Will in 1998, "tucked away in unexpected places".

History
Past events hosted at Wallace Park include the Nob Hill Business Association's festival in 2008, and a celebration for the inaugural Columbia Trail Fest in 2009, a fundraiser to raise money for Forest Park.

References

External links

1920 establishments in Oregon
Northwest District, Portland, Oregon
Parks in Portland, Oregon
Protected areas established in 1920